Bow City is a hamlet located in southeast Alberta, Canada within the County of Newell.

Demographics 
The population of Bow City according to the 2020 municipal census conducted by the County of Newell is 16.

See also 
List of communities in Alberta
List of hamlets in Alberta

References 

Hamlets in Alberta
County of Newell